Michael Earl Glenis McDonald Gilkes (born 20 July 1965) is an English professional football coach and former player who was recently interim manager of Championship club Reading, where he is also the manager of the club's academy. Gilkes played as a left winger from 1984 until 2003, most notably for Reading, and was also a Barbados international.

Playing career
Gilkes played more than 550 times as a professional and made his name with the Reading side that nearly won promotion to the Premier League in the early 1990s. A fast, tricky winger, he made over 400 appearances in all competitions for the Berkshire club as they went from the old Fourth Division to the very edge of the top flight. They finished second in the new Division One in 1995 (only missing out on automatic promotion due to the streamlining of the FA Premier League from 22 clubs to 20) and reached the playoff final, surrendering a 2–0 lead held until the 75th minute before losing 4–3 in extra time to Bolton Wanderers.

On 2 March 1988, Gilkes scored in the Simod Cup (Full Members cup) semi-final v Coventry City, in extra time of a game that was delayed due to crowd congestion. The goal, timed at 10.38pm, broke the record for the latest goal in British first class football. –He went on to score Reading's first in the Final on 27 March 1988, where they beat Luton Town 4–1.

Gilkes spent nearly thirteen years with the Royals, scoring 52 goals, before he was sold to Wolves in March 1997, managed by Mark McGhee who had departed from Reading to Wolves 16 months earlier.

He spent two seasons at Molineux before manager Keith Stevens signed him for Millwall. His time at the Molineux was less successful than it was at Elm Park, scoring just once in 38 league appearances, though he did come close to reaching the Premier League with them just as he had done at Reading. He joined Wolves just weeks before the end of the 1996–97 season, as they were edged out of the automatic promotion places to Barnsley and lost to Crystal Palace in the playoffs. A year later they finished ninth, missing out on the playoffs, but enjoyed a run to the FA Cup semi finals where they narrowly lost to Arsenal.

In a vote to compile the Royals' best-ever eleven, Gilkes was voted the best left-winger with 80.6% of the vote. Gilkes played at the Madejski Stadium in the Royals Legends game on 1 May 2006.

Later career
Gilkes was head coach of Southern League Division One South & West side Hungerford Town until November 2012, when he was appointed assistant manager at Conference South side Basingstoke Town. In November 2015, Gilkes was appointed first team manager for the remainder of the 2015–16 season, after Jason Bristow agreed to step down from the position, with Basingstoke Town at the bottom of the Conference South. Gilkes was sacked as Basingstoke manager in March 2016 and took a role at the Reading FC Academy. On 1 September 2017, Gilkes was promoted to first team coach at Reading, and on 19 February 2022 he was appointed interim team manager, alongside Paul Ince.

References

External links

Royals Legends video

1965 births
Living people
Footballers from the London Borough of Hackney
English sportspeople of Barbadian descent
People with acquired Barbadian citizenship
English footballers
Barbadian footballers
Barbados international footballers
English Football League players
Association football wingers
Reading F.C. players
Mikkelin Palloilijat players
Chelsea F.C. players
Millwall F.C. players
Southampton F.C. players
Wolverhampton Wanderers F.C. players
Slough Town F.C. players
Sports commentators
English football managers
Basingstoke Town F.C. managers